Oberhauser is a German surname.  Notable people with the surname include:

August Oberhauser (1895–1971), Swiss footballer
David Oberhauser (born 1989), French footballer
Josef Oberhauser (1915–1979), German Nazi SS concentration camp commandant and Holocaust perpetrator
Josef Oberhauser (bobsleigh) (born 1949), Austrian bobsledder
Karen Oberhauser (born 1956), American conservation biologist
Sabine Oberhauser (1963–2017), Austrian physician and politician

Fictional characters
Franz Oberhauser, fictional character also known as Ernst Stavro Blofeld

German toponymic surnames
German-language surnames